Tananger Church is a parish church of the Church of Norway in Sola Municipality in Rogaland county, Norway. It is located in the village of Tananger. It is the church for the Tananger parish which is part of the Tungenes prosti (deanery) in the Diocese of Stavanger. The large, brick church was built in a fan-shaped design in 2002 using designs by the architect Olav Urstad. The church seats about 400 people.

History
The church was built in 2002 to replace the Old Tananger Church, which was later renamed Tananger Chapel.  The new church was consecrated on 1 September 2002.

See also
List of churches in Rogaland

References

Sola, Norway
Churches in Rogaland
Brick churches in Norway
21st-century Church of Norway church buildings
Churches completed in 2002
2002 establishments in Norway